The 15769 / 70 Alipurduar Junction - Lumding Junction Intercity Express is an Express train belonging to Indian Railways Northeast Frontier Railway zone that runs between  and  in India.

Coaches
The 15769 / 70 Alipurduar Junction - Lumding Junction Intercity Express has nine general unreserved & two SLR (seating with luggage rake) coaches . It does not carry a pantry car coach.

As is customary with most train services in India, coach composition may be amended at the discretion of Indian Railways depending on demand.

Service

Routing
The 15769 / 70 Alipurduar Junction - Lumding Junction Intercity Express runs from 
 via 
Gossaigaon Hat

 to 
.

Traction
As the route is going to electrification, a  based WDM-3D diesel locomotive pulls the train to its destination.

References

External links
15769 Intercity Express at India Rail Info
15770 Intercity Express at India Rail Info

Intercity Express (Indian Railways) trains
Rail transport in Assam
Rail transport in West Bengal
Transport in Lumding
Alipurduar railway division